Lin Yueh-han (born 16 February 1993) is a Taiwanese footballer who currently plays as a defender for the national and club level. Lin is an indigenous Taiwanese and is of Atayal and Truku descent.

References

1993 births
Living people
Taiwanese footballers
Chinese Taipei international footballers
Taiwanese expatriate footballers
Taiwanese expatriate sportspeople in China
Expatriate footballers in China
Beijing Sport University F.C. players
China League One players
Taiwan Power Company F.C. players
People from Hualien County
Atayal people
Truku people
Association football defenders